Tana may refer to:

Places

Africa
 Lake Tana, a lake in Ethiopia (and a source of the Nile River)
 Tana Qirqos, an island in the eastern part of Lake Tana in Ethiopia, near the mouth of the Gumara River
 Tana River County, a county of Coast Province, Kenya
 Tana River (Kenya), the longest river in Kenya
 Tana, a shorthand form of Antananarivo, the capital of Madagascar
 Tana, Guinea, a small village in Guinea

Americas
 Tana Glacier, a glacier in the Valdez–Cordova Census Area, Alaska
 Tana River (Alaska), a river in the Valdez–Cordova Census Area, Alaska
 Tana River (Cuba), a river of southern Cuba
 Tana (volcano), a volcano on Chuginadak Island, Alaska

Asia
 Tanā Chōb, a village in Samangan, Afghanistan
 Tana, Iran, a village in Sistan and Baluchestan Province, Iran
 Kyzyl-Tana, a village in the Osh Province of Kyrgyzstan
 Tana Station, a railway station in the Aoba-ku, Yokohama, Kanagawa Prefecture, Japan
 Tana, Kukin Tana, or Tana Mayambu, former names of Thane, India

Europe
 Tana or Tanais, a medieval city and bishopric on the Sea of Azov
 Tana, Norway, a municipality in Norway
 Tana Bru, a village in the municipality
 Tana Church, a church in the village of Rustefjelbma, Tana
 Tana River (Norway), the third longest river in Norway

Oceania
 Tana or Tanna (island), an island in Vanuatu

People
 Tana (rapper), Steven Lewis, American rapper known under the name tana (born 2006)
 Tana, a variant of the given name Tanya
 Elijah Tana (born 1975), a former Zambian footballer
 Nick Tana, the former chairman of the Australian football club Perth Glory
 Rawat Tana (born 1977), a wheelchair racer from Thailand who competes at the Olympic level
 Tana and Riri, the twin sisters who chose to die rather than sing in Akbar's court, in India
 Tana Chanabut (born 1984), Thai footballer who plays for Pattaya United
 Táňa Fischerová (1947–2019), Czech actress, writer, television host, politician and civic activist
 Tana French (born 1973), Irish novelist and theatrical actress
 Tana Hoban (1917–2006), American author and photographer
 Tana Mongeau (born 1998), American Internet personality
 Tana Ramsay (born 1974), British TV broadcaster and author of bestselling books on cooking
 Tana Sripandorn (born 1986), a professional footballer from Thailand playing for Samut Songkhram FC
 Tana Umaga (born 1973), New Zealand rugby union footballer and former captain of the national team
 Tana Wood, biogeochemist and ecosystem scientist
 Pedro Tanausú Domínguez Placeres, commonly known as Tana (born 1990), a Spanish footballer

Fictional characters
 Tana, a character from the video game Fire Emblem: The Sacred Stones
 Tana Moon, a fictional character who was a reporter in Metropolis in the Superboy comics

Organizations
 Telugu Association of North America (TANA)
 Tana FC Formation, a football club from Madagascar
 Tana Oy, a Finnish waste management company

Religion and mythology
 Tāne, the Māori god of forests and of birds
 Tana, claimed to be an early Etruscan name for the Roman goddess Diana according to Charles Godfrey Leland, and recognized as such by some Neopagan groups
 The single form of Tannaim, Rabbinic sages whose views were record in the Mishnah

Other uses
 1641 Tana, a main-belt asteroid
 Tana, a minor Kazakh Jüz, or "tribe"
 Tāna (Thaana, Taana), the writing system for the Divehi language spoken in the Maldives
 Tana (film), an Albanian film from 1958
 Tána, "raids", a genre of ancient Irish tales, usually about a "cattle raid" (Táin Bó) 
 Tana (music), a type of musical note pattern in Indian classical music embellishing or exposing a rāga
 Tāne Mahuta, a giant Kauri tree in the Northland Region of New Zealand
 Tana (plant), genus in the family Apiaceae
 Tana (fly), a genus in subfamily Chiromyzinae

See also

 Taana (disambiguation)
 Tanna (disambiguation)
 Thana (disambiguation)
 Tane (disambiguation)
 Tan (disambiguation)
 Tanaji (Tana and -ji) , Indian male given name